China Railway Taiyuan Group, officially abbreviated as CR Taiyuan or CR-Taiyuan, formerly, Taiyuan Railway Administration is a subsidiaries company under the jurisdiction of the China Railway (formerly the Ministry of Railway). It supervises the railway network within Shanxi and the entire Daqin railway under a subsidiary Daqin Railway Company. The railway administration was reorganized as a limited liability company in November 2017.

Hub stations
 Taiyuan
 Datong
 
 Jinzhong
 
 Houma

References

Rail transport in Shanxi
China Railway Corporation